Battle of Mir was one of the first battles of the Polish–Russian War of 1792. It took place in the town of Mir, which is now part of Belarus on June 11, 1792.

Despite Lithuanian numerical superiority (8,000 to 5,500), they were defeated.

The Russian army of Boris Mellin defeated the Lithuanian force under Józef Judycki. The confrontation could have gone the other way if the 900 troops under Stanisław Kostka Potocki and Tomasz Wawrzecki were used to augment the defence; instead Judycki called a two-hour counsel. This gave time for the Russian forces to regroup and they were then able to prepare a final counterattack.

On that day there was also an assault and conquest of the Mir Castle Complex. Judycki left his troops and resorted to Grodno.

Disgraced Judycki was relieved of command soon afterwards, on June 17, to be replaced by Michał Zabiełło.

References

Further reading
 Wolański Adam, Wojna polsko-rosyjska 1792 r, Wydawnictwo Volumen, Warszawa 1996, 
 Derdej Piotr, Zieleńce Mir Dubienka 1792, Wydawnictwo Bellona, Warszawa 2000, 

Mir
Mir
1792 in the Polish–Lithuanian Commonwealth
Mir
Military history of Belarus
18th century in Belarus
Nowogródek Voivodeship (1507–1795)
Grodno Region
Mir, Belarus